Tomie Nishimura is a former international table tennis player from Japan.

Table tennis career
In 1952 she won two gold medals in women's doubles with Shizuka Narahara and the women's team events in the 1952 World Table Tennis Championships.

See also
 List of table tennis players
 List of World Table Tennis Championships medalists

References

Japanese female table tennis players
1933 births
Living people